Robert Ernest Levenhagen (October 2, 1925 – September 16, 1973) was a Canadian football player who played for the BC Lions and Calgary Stampeders. He played college football at the University of Washington.

References

1925 births
1973 deaths
BC Lions players
Calgary Stampeders players
Players of American football from Tacoma, Washington
American players of Canadian football
Washington Huskies football players